Ann Belford Ulanov is an American academic and psychotherapist. She is the Christiane Brooks Johnson Memorial Professor of Psychiatry and Religion at Union Theological Seminary in New York City and a Jungian analyst in private practice.

Education and career
Belford Ulanov  graduated with a B.A. degree from Radcliffe College in 1959 and received M.Div. and Ph.D. degrees from Union Theological Seminary, in 1962 and 1967 respectively. She is an Episcopalian and her teaching and research are in psychiatry and religion, with a special interest in issues of prayer and the spiritual life, aggression, anxiety, fantasy and dream, identity, and the feminine. She also manages the lecture series in memory of her late husband, Barry Ulanov.

Awards
In 1996, she won the Oskar Pfister Award for religion and psychology.

Works
The Feminine in Christian Theology and in Jungian Psychology 
Receiving Woman: Studies in the Psychology and Theology of the Feminine
Picturing God; The Wisdom of the Psyche; The Female Ancestors of Christ 
The Wizards’ Gate
The Functioning Transcendent 
Korean edition of our Religion and the Unconscious (1996) 
Korean edition of  Primary Speech (2001) 
Korean edition of Cinderella and Her Sisters (2002)
Religion and the Spiritual in Carl Jung 
Finding Space: Winnicott, God, and Psychic Reality
Attacked by Poison Ivy, A Psychological Study
Italian edition of Cinderella and Her Sisters (2003) 
Spiritual Aspects of Clinical Work (2004) 
Czech edition of The Female Ancestors of Christ
The Unshuttered Heart: Opening to Aliveness/Deadness in the Self
Creativity and Madness (2013)
Knots and Their Untying: Essays on Psychological Dilemmas (2014)
With her husband, Barry Ulanov:
Religion and the Unconscious
Primary Speech: A Psychology of Prayer 
Cinderella and Her Sisters: The Envied and the Envying 
The Witch and The Clown: Two Archetypes of Human Sexuality 
The Healing Imagination 
Transforming Sexuality: The Archetypal World of Anima and Animus

References

Sources
 Union Theological Seminary - Ann Belford Ulanov
 "The Space between Pastoral Care and Global Terrorism" in the Scottish Journal of Healthcare Chaplaincy

Living people
Jungian psychologists
American psychoanalysts
Radcliffe College alumni
Union Theological Seminary (New York City) alumni
Union Theological Seminary (New York City) faculty
Year of birth missing (living people)